Peter Moore Speer (December 29, 1862 – August 3, 1933) was a Republican member of the U.S. House of Representatives from Pennsylvania.

Peter M. Speer was born near Oil City, Pennsylvania.  He attended Allegheny College in Meadville, Pennsylvania, and the Westminster College in New Wilmington, Pennsylvania.  He graduated from Washington and Jefferson College in Washington, Pennsylvania, in 1887.  He studied law; was admitted to the bar in 1889 and commenced practice in Oil City.  He was district attorney of Venango County from 1891 to 1893.  He worked as city solicitor of Oil City from 1895 to 1906.  He was a member of the Pennsylvania State House of Representatives in 1897 and 1898.

Speer was elected as a Republican to the Sixty-second Congress.  He was an unsuccessful candidate for reelection in 1912.  He resumed the practice of law in Oil City.  He moved to New York City in 1918 and continued the practice of law.  He was the assistant general counsel for the Standard Oil Company from 1918 to 1922, as general counsel and member of the board of directors from 1922 to 1928, and as vice president from 1928 to 1932.  He retired from active business pursuits in 1932 and died in New York City in 1933.  Interment in Kensico Cemetery, near White Plains, New York.

Sources

The Political Graveyard

External links 
 

1862 births
1933 deaths
Allegheny College alumni
Westminster College (Pennsylvania) alumni
Pennsylvania lawyers
Washington & Jefferson College alumni
Politicians from New York City
People from Venango County, Pennsylvania
Burials at Kensico Cemetery
Republican Party members of the United States House of Representatives from Pennsylvania